The Russian State Arctic and Antarctic Museum is a museum in St. Petersburg, Russia. It was established in November 1930 as part of the Soviet Arctic and Antarctic Research Institute, but was not opened until six years later.

The museum is located in Avraam Melnikov's Neoclassical church from the 1820s and remains the largest museum dedicated to polar exploration in the world. The current director of the museum is Victor Boyarsky.

See also
List of museums in Saint Petersburg

References

External links
 Arctic and Antarctic Museum - official site

1930 establishments in Russia
Arctic research
Russia and the Antarctic
Science museums in Saint Petersburg
Natural history museums in Saint Petersburg
Art museums and galleries in Saint Petersburg
Museums established in 1930
Soviet Union and the Antarctic
Polar exploration by Russia and the Soviet Union
Antarctic research